María Zambrano Alarcón (22 April 1904 – 6 February 1991) was a Spanish essayist and philosopher associated with the Generation of '36 movement.  Her extensive work between the civic engagement and the poetic reflection started to be recognised in Spain over the last quarter of the 20th century after living many years in exile. She was awarded the Prince of Asturias Award (1981) and the Miguel de Cervantes Prize (1988).

Biography
María Zambrano Alarcón was born on 22 April 1904 in Vélez-Málaga, Spain, daughter of Blas José Zambrano García de Carabante, friend and collaborator of Antonio Machado, and Araceli Alarcón Delgado. In 1905, the family moved to Madrid and a year afterwards to Segovia, where her father obtained a job as Spanish Grammar professor. She spent there her teenage years.

Zambrano studied under and was influenced by José Ortega y Gasset and went on to teach metaphysics at Madrid University and at the Instituto Cervantes from 1931 to 1936. 
During the 20s and 30s, she actively campaigned for the establishment of the Spanish Second Republic. However, after Spain became a Republic again, disillusioned with the realities of party politics, she declined the possibility of becoming an MP and refused further participation in party politics. Nevertheless, with the outbreak of the Spanish Civil War in 1936, she openly sided with the Republic and consequently went into exile after its defeat in 1939.

After living in France, Mexico, Cuba, Puerto Rico, Italy, France again and Switzerland, Zambrano finally returned to Madrid in 1984 after the death of Franco. 

She died on 6 February 1991 in Madrid and was buried in the cemetery of her hometown Vélez-Málaga.

Recognition 
Respected by her peers, she maintained contact with Italian intellectuals as well as her compatriots Rafael Alberti and Jorge Guillén.

A slow process of recognition of her work commenced in Spain in 1966 with the publication of J. L. Aranguren's article "Los sueños de María Zambrano" (The Dreams of María Zambrano) in the important cultural and scientific Revista de Occidente, founded by Ortega y Gasset, a review to which leading contemporary philosophers such as Bertrand Russell and Edmund Husserl contributed.

In 1981, she was awarded the Prince of Asturias Award for Communications and Humanities in its first edition, and in 1983 Malaga University named her Doctor honoris causa.

In 1988, she became the first woman to be awarded the Miguel de Cervantes Prize.

María querida (Dearest Maria), a film directed by José Luis García Sánchez in 2004, is about her life.

In December 2007, when the Madrid-Málaga high-speed rail line was opened, railway company RENFE renamed Málaga railway station María Zambrano. Likewise, the central library of her alma mater, the Complutense University of Madrid was named after her. In 2017 the Segovia City Council unanimously approved to declare her an adopted daughter of the city. The campus of the Universidad of Valladolid in Segovia is named after her as well.

Philosophy 
For Zambrano, there are two main attitudes towards life: the philosophical and the poetic. Philosophy starts with the divine: daily things are explained with recourse to the gods, until someone ask himself: what are things? Thus, the philosophical attitude emerges when human beings wonder, i.e. because of ignorance. The poetic attitude is the answer, the calmness in which we explore the answers to everything, moved not by wonder born from ignorance, but by our human interest and desire to know, to understand, to share, to express.

Her philosophical attitude is conveyed by means of an unusual language and a creative expression of her way of thinking. It determines her literary style and is the basis for what she named her "method".

Politics 
In all Zambrano's work there is a political spirit manifested in very different ways in her thinking. Her political action was more direct in the preceding years of the establishment of the Second Republic and in the Civil War. Nonetheless, she refused to take part in any political party and thus rejected a seat in the General Courts offered by Jimenez de Asua. Although she opted to go on with her philosophical vocation, she did not give up on politics, and which she engaged from the core of thought itself. She explained in her first book "Horizonte del liberalismo"(1930), that "politics are done always when it is thought to direct life" and that is precisely what she aspired to achieve by means of her poetic activity, criticism of fascist movements, the discursive reason, and rationalism.

Bibliography 

Selected primary literature:
 Horizonte del liberalismo (Horizon of Liberalism) (1930).
 Hacia un saber del alma (1934).
 Filosofía y poesía (Philosophy and Poetry) (1940).
 La agonía de Europa (The Agony of Europe) (1945).
 Hacia un saber sobre el alma (Towards a Knowledge of the Soul) (1950).
 El hombre y lo divino  (Man and the Divine) (1955).
 Persona y democracia (Person and Democracy) (1959).
 España, sueño y verdad (Spain, dream and truth) (1965).
 La tumba de Antígona (Antigone's Tomb) (1967).
 Claros del bosque (1977).
 De la aurora (1986).
 Los bienaventurados (1979).
 El pensamiento vivo de Séneca (1941).
 El sueño creador (1965).
 Los sueños y el tiempo (reissued in 1998).
 El reposo de la luz (1986).
 Para una historia de la piedad (Towards a history of charity) (1989).
 Delirio y destino (written in 1953; published in 1989), translated by Carol Maier, with a commentary by Roberta Johnson, Delirium and Destiny: A Spaniard in Her Twenties (Albany: State University of New York Press, 1999).
 Unamuno (written in 1940; published in 2003).
 Cartas de la Pièce. Correspondencia con Agustín Andreu (2002).
 Islas (Islands) (Ed. Jorge Luis Arcos) (2007).
Secondary literature:
 Bush, Andrew. "María Zambrano and the Survival of Antigone," diacritics 34 (3–4) (2004): 90–111.
 Caballero, Beatriz. "La centralidad del concepto de delirio en el pensamiento de María Zambrano," Arizona Journal of Hispanic Cultural Studies (12) (2008): 89–106.
 Caballero Rodríguez, Beatriz. María Zambrano: A Life of Poetic Reason and Political Commitment. Cardiff: University of Wales Press (2017).
 Special Issue: María Zambrano In Dialogue. Journal of Spanish Cultural Studies 16. 4
 Ros, Xon. The Cultural Legacy of María Zambrano. Cambridge: Legenda (2017).

Sources 
 Claire Buck (ed.), Bloomsbury Guide to Women's Literature (1992)
 Caballero Rodríguez, Beatriz, María Zambrano: A Life of Poetic Reason and Political Commitment (Wales University Press, 2017).

External links 

 Biographical chronology in Spanish.
 Extensive bibliography in Spanish.
 Philosophy and Poetry translation

1904 births
1991 deaths
People from Vélez-Málaga
Premio Cervantes winners
20th-century Spanish philosophers
Spanish women writers
Spanish essayists
Spanish people of the Spanish Civil War (Republican faction)
Exiles of the Spanish Civil War in France
Spanish women philosophers
Spanish women essayists
20th-century women writers
Exiles of the Spanish Civil War in Switzerland
Exiles of the Spanish Civil War in Cuba
Exiles of the Spanish Civil War in the United States
20th-century essayists
Spanish women of the Spanish Civil War (Republican faction)
Women in the Spanish Civil War
Las Sinsombrero members